Robert Clements was a Scottish footballer, who played for Leith Athletic and Scotland.

References

Sources

External links

London Hearts profile

Year of birth missing
Year of death missing
Scottish footballers
Scotland international footballers
Association football inside forwards
Leith Athletic F.C. players
Place of birth missing
Place of death missing